The Gog Magog Hills are a range of low chalk hills, extending for several miles to the southeast of Cambridge in England. The area as a whole is undefined but is roughly the elevated area lying north west of the  col at Worsted Lodge.

Unlike the nearby hills of the Newmarket Ridge, which have steep sides but very flat tops, these hills have large drops between summits and as such have quite a distinctive appearance; Little Trees Hill looks particularly good from Huckeridge Hill near Sawston, and White Hill dominates the view from the National Cycle Route 11 section towards Great Shelford. The hills therefore have relatively high topographic prominence.
Other tops include: Limepit Hill   — Mag's Hill — Copley Hill  — Meggs Hill — Fox Hill — Clarke's Hill — White Hill

History 
In English folklore and the Matter of Britain, Gogmagog was a giant, and according to Geoffrey of Monmouth's influential 12th-century Historia Regum Britanniae, one of the inhabitants of Albion discovered by Brutus of Troy and his men. He was the last of the giants that they killed, and was thrown from a cliff by Corineus.

The book Where Troy Once Stood argues that the ancient city of Troy was in fact located in the Gog Magog Downs; however, this is not taken seriously by scholars.

The earliest mention of the name Gog Magog for this region is found in a decree of 1574, forbidding students to visit the Gog Magog Hills on pain of a fine. Random excavations around the hills revealed the remains of defences at Copley Hill and Cherry Hinton, not older than the Iron Age but the sites themselves are now known already to have been occupied in the Bronze Age. The better-preserved hill fort known as the Wandlebury Ring, which is now situated in a public park, had several concentric ditches and earthen walls, which were kept in place by wooden palisades. It was already inhabited in the Bronze Age and archaeological finds include bronze and iron objects and pottery, including "Knobbed Ware", dating from the Bronze Age.

"Telegraph clump" functioned as one of the locations for the semaphore line, an optical telegraph system, between London and Great Yarmouth from around the 1820s to around 1850.

The dowser and archaeologist T. C. Lethbridge claimed to have found some ancient hill figures buried in the chalk under the surface of the hills. These are purported to represent a sun-god, a moon-goddess and a warrior-god. Lethbridge's claims, however, were controversial and are not widely accepted.

Part of the chalk downs have been converted into a golf course since 1901 by the Gog Magog Golf Club, but much is designated as a Site of Special Scientific Interest.

Magog Down
In 1989 the Magog Trust, a charity and registered company created for the purpose, bought  of former farmland surrounding Little Trees Hill for £327,100 so that it could be returned to chalk grassland and opened to the public. The reserve was named Magog Down. Some of the money to buy the land came from the sale of "Gogs" to the general public: these were notional areas of land costing £5 each but without title or rights. As well as re-establishing chalkland plants and insects, Magog Down has become well used for recreation, and is very well used by dog walkers. A 5-mile running race involving two laps of the reserve and a shorter fun-run have helped raise funds for the local primary school for several years. The Cambridge University Hare and Hounds running club have also used Magog Down as the venue for their tri-annual hosting of the RAF Match.

Magog Down is situated across the A1307 road from the Wandlebury country park (which itself has been managed since 1954 by Cambridge Past Present and Future). Both Magog Down and Wandlebury Country Park are very popular places to visit for fresh air and recreation on the edge of Cambridge.

Naming 
Locals tend to refer to the open access areas on these hills as simply the Gogs, usually in reference to Magog Down, though some people may also use the term to refer to Wandlebury Country Park. The local paper, Cambridge News, tends to refer to "the Gog Magogs" as a general term, lumping Wandlebury and Magog Down together. To further confuse matters, the adjacent Gog Magog Hills Farm Shop and Cafe re-branded itself in 2016 to be called "The Gog".

The postal address "Gog Magog Hills" is shared by 16 addresses on the Gog Magog Hills Estate which are mostly within the grounds of Wandlebury Country Park.

Busway proposals 
In February 2016 the Greater Cambridge City Deal (since renamed the Greater Cambridge Partnership) published early-stage "concepts" for improved transport links along the A1307, which included the idea of a new, off-road busway apparently straight across the Gog Magog Hills, possibly through or adjacent to the edge of Magog Down. This concept was met with dismay by both Cambridge Past Present and Future and the Magog Trust. Later that month reassurances were made that any busway would not go through the hills; the formal consultation document in June 2016 still included an off-road busway option, albeit with the line on the map drawn slightly further south from Magog Down. The preferred options following the 2016 consultation were stated to include an in-bound (towards Cambridge) bus lane alongside the A1307, however by October 2017 the proposal for an off-road busway was back on the agenda again.

See also
 Army Manoeuvres of 1912
 Beechwoods nature reserve
 Chalk Group
 East Cambridgeshire
 Guildhall, London for the characters Gog and Magog. How their names came to be attached to these hills is unknown.

References

Mapping

External links
Ritual activity at the foot of the Gog Magog Hills
Fortean Traveller: The Gog Magog Hills, Cambridgeshire
Stapleford Fun Run

Hills of Cambridgeshire
Iron Age sites in England
Tourist attractions in Cambridgeshire
Archaeological sites in Cambridgeshire
Former populated places in Cambridgeshire
Bronze Age sites in Cambridgeshire